A list of Bangladeshi films released in 1991.

Releases

See also

 1991 in Bangladesh

References

Film
Bangladesh
 1991